The Dragon's Snake Fist (Also known as Disciple of Yong-mun Depraved Monk or Dragon Force) is 1981 Korean and Hong Kong martial art movie directed by Godfrey Ho and starring Dragon Lee.

Plot
Two fighters, Chu Man King and Master Wai, who are from different kung fu styles (Snake fist and Crane fist) meet for a duel secretly. The loser must leave the town and allow the winner to his art in peace. Chu Man King wins; Master Wai is upset and plans revenge. Several years after the duel, Chu Man King decides to send his students across the land to spread his Snake fist art.

Along the way one of Chu Man King's best students, Dragon Wu, is attacked by Wai's son and his gang from the Crane fist school. When they figure out that Wu was from the Snake fist school they decide to teach him a lesson. However, they let him go when his sister reminds him that if their father (Master Wai) found out what happened he would not be pleased. Wu continues his journey for his village for his new Snake fist school and to marry his arranged bride. This do not go smoothly since the students from the Crane fist school interrupt Wu's plan, however Wu still done his job done. Meanwhile, old Master Wai is still bitter over his defeat all those years ago and one of his legs is completely useless. He kept this as a secret from his son and daughter.

However Wai's son wants to know the truth and he decides to send a fake birthday invitation to Master Chu so he can have a duel with him. When Master Wai finds out about his son's actions, he is furious and tells him to stop it. Wai's son pays no attention to his father's advice and decides to take revenge on Master Chu and destroy the Snake fist school. Even worse, Wai's son kidnaps Wu's wife and Wu decides to destroy the Crane fist school.

Cast

Dragon Lee as Dragon Wu
Martin Chui Man-Fooi as Master Wai
Gam Kei-Chu as Master Chu Man King
Yuen Qiu as Master Wai's daughter (as Phoenix Kim)
Kim Young Suk as Master Wai's son 
Seo Jeong-Ah as Jen (Wu's arranged wife)
Moon Jeong Kum
Bruce Lai as Invincible Tiger (as Chang Yi-Tao)
Gam Gei-Fan as Mr.Lau (Master Wai's assistant)

Media Release

The movie was released through with the VHS by IFD films and Arts, later on it was released in Hong Kong through VCD with rare Mandarin dubbed version. Around 2000, it was released through DVD however with the simple VHS recording DVD. In 2009, the company Rarescope who will release numerous Kung Fu movies on DVD attempted to release the movie with the remastered version, however the official release of the DVD has been canceled however the unreleased remastered version will later on could find on YouTube (which now it has been deleted from the public domain movie category due to the copyright.). In 2015, the British company Terracotta Distribution who has been released the movies in remastered addition (such as Shanghai 13, Hero of Shaolin and others) officially released the DVD with the trailer, with the region PAL it has been fully remastered with Digital stereo.

External links

1981 films
1981 martial arts films
1980s Korean-language films
South Korean martial arts films
Bruceploitation films